Joshua Ian Schwartz (born August 6, 1976) is an American screenwriter and television producer. Schwartz is best known for creating and executive producing the Fox teen drama series The O.C. which ran for 4 seasons. Schwartz is also known for developing The CW's series Gossip Girl based on the book of the same name and for co-creating NBC's action-comedy-spy series, Chuck.

At 26, he became one of the youngest people in network history to create a series and run its day-to-day production when he ran The O.C.

Early life 
Schwartz was born to a Jewish family in 1976 in Providence, Rhode Island, the son of Steve and Honey Schwartz. His parents were both toy inventors at Hasbro, working on the development of toys such as Transformers and My Little Pony, until they went on to start their own company.  Schwartz grew up on the east side of Providence, Rhode Island with a younger brother, Danny, and a younger sister, Katie. Schwartz always had ambitions of being a writer since early childhood.

When Schwartz was seven years old, he won an essay-writing contest at Summer camp for a review of the recently released movie Gremlins; the opening line was "Spielberg has done it again" and stood out amongst the other submissions. By age twelve, he had a subscription to the entertainment industry newspaper Variety.

He attended Providence's private Wheeler School, a coeducational independent day school, for 11 years, graduating with the class of 1994.

Career
In 1995, Schwartz attended film school to study screen and television writing at the University of Southern California (USC). He became a member of the Pi Kappa Alpha fraternity, as well as president of the chapter, and got to see what it's like "behind the gated communities and big mansions" of Southern California which would later provide fodder for his pilot The O.C.

While at USC, Schwartz tried out stand-up comedy at a talent show in front of five hundred people but was "disabused of [the] notion very quickly."
In his sophomore year he wrote an autobiographical screenplay about his senior year in high school called Providence as a homework assignment for school. He entered his screenplay into a contest for the prestigious Nicholson Award in Screenwriting, the highest honor awarded to undergraduates, and won. Unfortunately, the prize was quickly revoked; to be eligible he had to be in his junior year at the time. Schwartz says "I dropped it in a box – I was a sophomore. And I got a call over the summer saying I'd won, and I'd won five thousand dollars. I was like, 'This is awesome!' Then they called back, like, the next day and said you had to be a junior to enter and not a sophomore, so they were rescinding it. I was pretty pissed." Nevertheless, with help from connections through his fraternity, he generated interest in Hollywood to buy his screenplay. In 1997, Sony's TriStar Pictures bought his first screenplay in a bidding war for a deal guaranteeing $550,000 and worth up to $1 million while he was still a junior in college. It was never made.

Schwartz got an agent and subsequently wrote a TV pilot called Brookfield for ABC/Disney while he was still studying at USC. It was a boarding school drama about wealthy kids in New England and was his first TV pilot script; it sold only a few months after he had sold his first feature film script. Brookfield was produced starring Amy Smart and Eric Balfour but never aired. Schwartz then dropped out of USC to work full-time and wrote another pilot called Wall to Wall Records, a drama about working in a music store for Warner Bros. TV that was also produced but never aired.

His writing influences include Cameron Crowe and Woody Allen.

The O.C. (2003–2007)

In 2003, Schwartz wrote a pilot called The O.C. for Warner Bros. TV and Wonderland Sound and Vision which was produced with him as creator and executive producer. At 26 he was the youngest ever creator of a TV show, which did not sit well with Fox executives who sent a series of seasoned pros armed with conventional ideas about how to steer the show and a bitterness about sharing control with someone so young. That changed when Bob DeLaurentis signed on, a TV veteran who proved to be a nurturing presence on the show. Schwartz and Bob DeLaurentis collaborated on supervising and approving the editors' work on each episode in post-production.

The O.C. became an instant teen favorite when it debuted on the Fox Network in August 2003. The show popularized its setting, Orange County, and led to copycats like MTV's reality show Laguna Beach: The Real Orange County and the Bravo documentary series The Real Housewives of Orange County. The show became well known for its music, chosen by Schwartz according to his own musical tastes and designed to reflect who the characters were, bringing the general public an awareness of indie rock bands like Death Cab for Cutie, Bloc Party and Rooney. He has said that he partially based The O.C. character Seth Cohen on his own Jewish upbringing. Schwartz was nominated for a Writers Guild of America Award for the pilot as well as a People's Choice Award. The O.C. was named "Guilty Pleasure of the Year" by VH1. In 2007, after 4 seasons The O.C. was canceled due to a significant ratings drop.

Schwartz has stayed in touch with his alma maters: The Wheeler School and USC. In 2005, he endowed USC with its first television writing scholarship: The Josh Schwartz Scholarship. The scholarship is intended to be awarded annually to a student or students concentrating on writing for television and in need of financial assistance, who have completed a TV pilot script and first season synopsis. Although Schwartz never graduated from USC he has since worked with many USC alumni. In 2005 he gave a commencement speech to The Wheeler School.

Schwartz has worked on his share of stalled projects. In 2004, he worked as a script doctor on the J. J. Abrams Superman screenplay that Warner Bros. eventually tossed. He sold a pilot to Fox called Alphabet City, a drama about a New York tabloid but it was never produced. He also worked on a drama for Fox called Athens described as an "OC" companion but it was never produced.

Recent projects (2007–present)

In 2005, Paramount signed Schwartz to adapt and direct John Green's young adult novel Looking for Alaska with producer Mark Waters.

It was revealed in late August 2006 that Schwartz would develop and executive produce a drama pilot for The CW, based on the popular book series Gossip Girl by Cecily von Ziegesar. Similar to The O.C., Gossip Girl is a satirical approach of teenagers in a wealthy upbringing. Gossip Girl has become a very popular show for The CW.

In 2007, Schwartz signed a three-year, seven-figure overall deal with Warner Bros. TV to write and exec produce with Chris Fedak an hourlong high-concept action comedy called Chuck for NBC about twenty-something spies and was described in press releases as "in the vein of Grosse Pointe Blank". The plot revolves around a normal guy who downloads the entire CIA and NSA databases into his head.

In May 2008, Schwartz joined Zak Penn's X-Men: First Class project. Schwartz announced that he will write the script for X-Men: First Class, a prequel to the X-Men movies that focuses on the adventures of teen Cyclops, Marvel Girl, Professor X, Beast, Iceman, and Angel. However, his script was later jettisoned.

In Spring 2009, Schwartz launched "Rockville CA", a web-series on TheWB.com that follows young 20-somethings at a fictional rock club in Los Angeles. There are twenty indie band performances in the episodes, including Lykke Li, The Kooks and Kaiser Chiefs.

It was also announced that Schwartz would write and direct Bright Lights, Big City for MGM, based on the iconic debut novel by Jay McInerney. Stephanie Savage was also announced as producer.

In February 2011, The CW ordered a pilot of his new project titled Hart of Dixie.  The show is co-produced with longtime creative partner Stephanie Savage and stars former "O.C." castmember and personal friend of Schwartz, Rachel Bilson. The show was picked up in May 2011 and premiered in fall 2011. At the same time, Schwartz has also been working on a Georgetown pilot for ABC However, ABC did not pick the series for its 2011 - 2012 schedule.

In September 2011, it was announced by The CW that Schwartz and Stephanie Savage had been selected to develop the television adaption of Candace Bushnell's The Carrie Diaries, a prequel to the original Sex and the City television series. The series, set in the 1980s, will follow character Carrie Bradshaw during her years in high school.

In January 2012, it was announced The CW had ordered a pilot for new drama titled Cult, result of collaboration with Stephanie Savage and Len Goldstein. This is Schwartz and Savage's fourth series on the network.

He also developed several adaptations of popular properties, such as Runaways for Marvel, a reboot of Dynasty and Nancy Drew for CW.

Personal life
On September 20, 2008, Schwartz married Jill Stonerock in Santa Barbara, California. Actress Rachel Bilson, who portrayed Summer Roberts on Schwartz's show The O.C., was the maid of honor at the wedding. They have two daughters, of whom Bilson is the godmother.

Filmography

Film

Television

Web

References

Further information

External links

 
 PopGurls Interview: Josh Schwartz

1976 births
American male screenwriters
American television producers
Jewish American writers
Showrunners
Living people
Businesspeople from Providence, Rhode Island
USC School of Cinematic Arts alumni
American soap opera writers
The O.C.
Chuck (TV series)
Writers from Providence, Rhode Island
American male television writers
Screenwriters from Rhode Island